Summer of Secrets is the second part of the 21st century Austen series by Rosie Rushton. It was published in 2007 by Piccadilly Press It is an adaptation of Jane Austen's 1817 novel Northanger Abbey.

Plot summary 
Caitlin Morland wins an art scholarship to Mulberry Court school. There she meets Izzy Thorpe and Summer Tilney, whose parents are famous. She is a bit jealous of their fame and unlimited money. Caitlin cannot believe it when they say it is not fun having famous parents.

Izzy Thorpe wants to visit Caitlin's home. After a lesson, when Caitlin was talking about Rubens' picture, Izzy visits her new friend. She is impressed with Caitlin's house and family, especially with her brother, Jamie. A few weeks before Izzy's birthday party, Izzy, Caitlin, Jamie and Tom go to a party in a club. Caitlin orders a juice. Summer talks to her, and then Bianca Joseph comes and takes Caitlin to chat with two boys. Caitlin tries to get there, but somebody hits her and the juice gets out of her glass. That's how she meets Ludo. He offers her something to drink and they talk about Summer. Tom comes and say he wants to take her to another club, but Caitlin declines. She tells Ludo that, Summer is in the bathroom. In the evening Caitlin draws a portrait of Ludo.

Caitlin dresses herself as a Rose from "Titanic” for Izzy's party. She waters herself during the party. Suddenly somebody knocks the door. They are journalists, who want to talk to Izzy's dad, so the girl tell them that her parent are in Royal Pavillon. A few days later, Izzy goes to Caitlin's place. Caitlin tells her parents that, she has been invited to spend two weeks in Casa Vernazza with Summer. Her parents agree and Jamie also joins them.

During the flight to Italy, Caitlin reads some tabloids and Ludo notices it. He pretends to be interested in stars’  private life. He then reads a book and Caitlin starts to think that, he does not like her. Gabriella and Luigi come to take them from the airport. Ludo and Caitlin go with Gabriella. When she visits her friend, they talk about Summer.

Soon they arrive at Casa Vernazza, Summer shows Caitlin her room and her own mother's pictures. They go into town. Caitlin walks next to the church and she hears Summer's voice. Her friend is talking with a man. She meets  Ludo and his father. Ludo invites Caitlin to ride his yacht with him later on. During supper they discuss this and as a result Freddie, Izzy, Jamie, Gabriella and Summer go with them too.

During the trip everybody goes swimming except Jamie. Summer and Caitlin abruptly set off to the local gallery. There they pretend to be students, who are working on an article about Elena Cumani-Tilney's pictures. But when Lorenzo brings one of them, Summer cries and he knows that, she is Elena's daughter. Ludo calls Caitlin and tells her to come back. Summer will not talk to her because she thinks that Caitlin was after her, when they went to town. Luckily this does not lead to an argument. Caitlin decides to help Summer discover how her mother died. After some time she says that Sir Magnus and Gabriella must have murdered her mother, but she will not talk about it to Summer.

In Elena's paintings, Caitlin finds a pretty one called Abbey, July 2004. She finds it in the Internet and discovers that, it is a mental hospital. All of a sudden Summer runs away from home. Whilst everybody is searching for her somebody calls from hospital to inform that Freddie and Izzy had had an accident. Alex di Matteo comes to the Tilneys’ house. He talks to her about his trip to Milan with his grandma, but she had thought that he had another girlfriend. Summer calls Caitlin and everything is explained.

Ludo takes her for a walk and tells that, he in fact loves her. A few days later they open a gallery of Elena Cumani-Tilney's paintings in a house next to the Tilneys’. In the evening, they go for a ride on Ludo's yacht. First, Ludo wants to know if Caitlin is going to send an article about his mother's death to tabloid. She says that she is not but, that she has some titles in her head. Ludo tells Caitlin that he fell in love with her when he saw how seriously she treats those articles. However, Caitlin doesn't believe him in the beginning so he kisses her and all ends well.

Characters 
Caitlin Morland - new student in Mulberry Court. She's Summer's best friend. She is in love with her brother, Ludo. She can take very good photos.
Summer Tilney - Caitlin's new friend. Her mother died. She's in love with Alex di Matteo. Daughter of Magnus Tilney.
Isabella "Izzy" Thorpe - daughter of a politician. She's Caitlin's friend. She's got a crush on her brother and Freddie.
Ludovic "Ludo" Tilney - Summer's brother. Freddie is his twin brother. He's in love with Caitlin.
James "Jamie" Morland - Caitlin's elder brother. He's in love with Izzy.
Freddie Tilney - Ludo's and Summer's brother. He takes drugs and is often drunk. He has a crush on Izzy.
sir Magnus Tilney - Summer's, Ludo's and Freddie's father. Owner of jam factory.
Elena Cumani-Tilney - Magnus Tilney's wife. She died, because she hit her head. She was an artist and was a bit crazy.
Lynne Morland - Caitlin's mother. She's a housewife
Edward Morland - Caitlin's father. He's a lawyer in Morland, Croft & Isingworth.
Bianca Joseph - Caitlin's friend from school.
Tom Porter - Jamie's friend, who's in love with Caitlin.
Gabriella - Magnus Tilney's fiancée. Elena's friend.
Luigi - Tilneys' driver from their house in Liguria.
Tony di Matteo - Alex's father. Elena talked that he's Summer's father.
Lorenzo - owner of an art gallery.
Mrs. Cathcart - a teacher in  Mulberry Court.

British young adult novels
2007 British novels
Adaptations of works by Jane Austen
Novels by Rosie Rushton
Northanger Abbey